Ezetimibe/atorvastatin (trade names Liptruzet, Atozet) is a cholesterol lowering combination drug.  In the United States, it was approved in May 2013, by the Food and Drug Administration for the treatment of elevated low-density lipoprotein (LDL) in patients with primary or mixed hyperlipidemia as adjunctive therapy to diet. It has also been approved to reduce elevated total cholesterol and elevated LDL in patients diagnosed with homozygous familial hypercholesterolemia as an adjunctive treatment to other hyperlipidemia treatments.

Some cardiologists opposed the approval, because the combination reduced LDL cholesterol in a clinical trial, but it did not reduce heart disease. A clinical trial studying the endpoints of heart attacks, strokes and heart-related deaths is scheduled to conclude in 2014.

Liptruzet was withdrawn from sale by its manufacturer in June 2015, but not for reasons of safety or effectiveness.

Mechanism of action
This combination drug works to reduce cholesterol levels through two different pathways. The ezetimibe component of the medication works by inhibiting cholesterol absorption from food while the atorvastatin component inhibits intrinsic cholesterol production in the liver.

Safety
The drug is not safe to use in patients with active liver disease or unexplained persistent elevations in hepatic transaminase.
Women that are pregnant or may become pregnant should not use the drug. It is a teratogenic agent that may disrupt the growth and development of a fetus. Immediate discontinuation is recommended in patients that become pregnant while taking this drug.

Adverse effects
Commonly reported adverse effects include:
Musculoskeletal pain
Elevated liver enzymes (AST and ALT)
Gastrointestinal problems such as abdominal pain and nausea

See also
 Ezetimibe
 Ezetimibe/simvastatin

References

Hypolipidemic agents
Combination drugs
Merck & Co. brands
Withdrawn drugs